Rhabdochona is a genus of nematodes belonging to the family Thelaziidae.

The species of this genus are found in Northern America.

Species:
 Rhabdochona canadensis Moravec & Arai, 1971 
 Rhabdochona cascadilla Wigdor, 1918

References

Rhabditida
Rhabditida genera